Linda Fröhlich (born June 23, 1979) is a German professional basketball player in the WNBA.

European career

2006-2007:  Fenerbahçe Istanbul
2005-2006:  Spartak Moscow
2006-2007:  Taranto Cras Basket
2010:  Municipal MCM Târgovişte.

UNLV statistics

Source

References

External links 
 WNBA player profile
 WNBA article
Official Linda Frohlich pages
Linda Frohlich's Istanbul memories

1979 births
Living people
All-American college women's basketball players
Centers (basketball)
Club Sportiv Municipal Târgoviște players
Fenerbahçe women's basketball players
German expatriate basketball people in the United States
German expatriate sportspeople in Turkey
German women's basketball players
Indiana Fever players
New York Liberty draft picks
New York Liberty players
Sportspeople from Pforzheim
Power forwards (basketball)
Sacramento Monarchs players
UNLV Lady Rebels basketball players